First Among Equals may refer to:

 First Among Equals (novel), a 1984 novel by Jeffrey Archer
 First Among Equals (TV series), a 1986 television series based on the novel
 "First Among Equals" (The Adventures of the Black Stallion), an episode of the TV series The Adventures of the Black Stallion